Statistics of Kuwaiti Premier League in the 1968–69 season.

Overview
Al Qadisiya Kuwait won the championship.

References
RSSSF

Kuwait Premier League seasons
Kuwait
football